The 1988 Laurence Olivier Awards were held in 1988 in London celebrating excellence in West End theatre by the Society of London Theatre.

Winners and nominees
Details of winners (in bold) and nominees, in each award category, per the Society of London Theatre.

Productions with multiple nominations and awards
The following 19 productions received multiple nominations:

 4: Candide and The Wizard of Oz
 3: A Family Affair, A Touch of the Poet, An Enemy of the People, Blood Brothers, Our Country's Good, Separation, The Secret Rapture, Titus Andronicus and Too Clever by Half
 2: A Walk in the Woods, Cat on a Hot Tin Roof, Hello and Goodbye, Henceforward, Mrs. Klein, Shirley Valentine, Sugar Babies and The Shaughraun

The following five productions received multiple awards:

 3: Candide and Too Clever by Half
 2: Our Country's Good, Shirley Valentine and Titus Andronicus

See also
 42nd Tony Awards

References

External links
 Previous Olivier Winners – 1988

Laurence Olivier Awards ceremonies
Laurence Olivier Awards, 1988
Laurence Olivier Awards
Laurence Olivier Awards